Christos Tzioras (born 5 October 1988) is a Greek professional footballer who plays as a striker for Super League 2 club Niki Volos.

References
 
 footballleaguenews.gr

1988 births
Greek footballers
Living people
Association football forwards
Gamma Ethniki players
Delta Ethniki players
Football League (Greece) players
Super League Greece 2 players
Polykastro F.C. players
Kozani F.C. players
Pyrsos Grevena F.C. players
Aetos Skydra F.C. players
Panargiakos F.C. players
Vataniakos F.C. players
Niki Volos F.C. players
Apollon Smyrnis F.C. players
Acharnaikos F.C. players
Veria F.C. players
A.E. Karaiskakis F.C. players
AO Chania F.C. players
Levadiakos F.C. players
People from Askio, Kozani
Footballers from Western Macedonia